The Skelmersdale branch was a standard gauge railway (SKE) which connected the Liverpool, Ormskirk and Preston Railway at Ormskirk with Rainford Junction via Skelmersdale. At Rainford it connected with the Liverpool and Bury Railway and the St. Helens Railway. It was built by the East Lancashire Railway, which was taken over by the Lancashire and Yorkshire Railway shortly afterward. The steam railmotor which served the line was sometimes known locally as the "Skem Dodger" and other times as the "Skem Jazzer".

History
Opened on 1 March 1858, passenger services ended 5 November 1956, with goods trains to Rainford ceasing on 16 November 1961 and to Skelmersdale on 4 November 1963. Since then Skelmersdale has had no rail connection but has grown considerably.

Re-opening proposals
Proposals have been put forward for the reopening of a section of line, reconnecting trains for Skelmersdale into Merseyrail's Northern Line Ormskirk branch. In June 2009, the Association of Train Operating Companies, in its Expanding Access to the Rail Network report, called for funding for the reopening of this station as part of a £500m scheme to open 33 stations on 14 lines closed in the Beeching Axe, including seven new parkway stations. The report proposes extending the line from Ormskirk railway station by laying 3 miles of new single track along the previous route towards Rainford Junction, at a cost estimated to be in the region of £31m. The route is largely intact, however deviation north of Westhead would be required. The proposed Skelmersdale station would be on the north west corner of the town near the Skelmersdale Ring Road, right next to where the old station once was.

In December 2012, Merseytravel commissioned Network Rail to study route options and costs of connecting to Skelmersdale with Merseytravel contributing £50,000 and West Lancashire Council contributing £100,000. The range of options considered including a simple park and ride on the existing Northern Line Kirkby branch, an extension of the Northern Line Kirkby branch to a new terminus in Skelmersdale and finally a connection from the Northern Line Ormskirk branch, possibly extended to create a loop via Skelmersdale between Kirkby and Ormskirk. Merseytravel were represented on a board led by Lancashire County Council who developed a flowchart detailing how the scheme may be delivered. In 2014, the reopening of a section of the Skelmersdale Branch from Upholland to Skelmersdale town centre was proposed. The line was completely closed in 1963. This would give Skelmersdale, the second largest town in North West England without a railway service, direct access to Liverpool city centre. Network Rail recommended a further feasibility study be carried out.

In February 2017 Lancashire County Council confirmed that the preferred site for Skelmersdale railway station was the former site of Glenburn Sports College/Westbank Campus. County Council Transport portfolio holder John Fillis said that the site "is big enough to provide a high quality station with scope to expand to meet future demand.". By September, Merseytravel announced that they would be committing £765,000 to the study into the re-opening, estimating that the station could be open within a decade with a lot of additional funding. Merseytravel's plan would also see a new station built at Headbolt Lane in Kirkby. It has been proposed a new station at Skelmersdale would act as the terminus for Merseyrail's Northern Line, with connections available to Wigan and Manchester. Initial estimates suggest that the scheme could cost around £300 million to develop.  On page 36 of the Liverpool City Region Combined Authority, Long Term Rail Strategy document of October 2017, it states that Merseytravel is currently working with Lancashire County Council and Network Rail to develop a plan to extend the Merseyrail network from Kirkby through to Skelmersdale, with work completed in 2019. They are considering 3rd rail electrification and other alternatives with a new station at Headbolt Lane to serve the Northwood area of Kirkby. The document on page 37 states two trials of electric 3rd rail/battery trains will be undertaken in 2020, this is one of the "alternatives".

The government in April 2020 gave assurances that the Skelemersdale link would be constructed. Lancashire County Council submitted their Strategic Outline Business Case to the DfT in September 2021. This forwards two rail options. The favoured is a heavy rail link into the town centre. The submission mentions the use of battery electric Class 777 trains.

This line has been identified by Campaign for Better Transport as a priority 1 candidate for reopening.

Plans for reopening were dealt a serious blow when the Department for Transport announced in July 2022 that it was rejecting the Strategic Outline Business Case. The DfT instead suggested that better bus links with the Kirkby–Wigan rail line would be a cheaper way of improving connectivity for Skelmersdale.

Route
Ormskirk railway station
Westhead Halt railway station
Skelmersdale railway station
White Moss Level Crossing Halt
Hey's Crossing Halt railway station
Rainford Junction railway station

References

Sources

Lancashire and Yorkshire Railway
Closed railway lines in North West England
Ormskirk
Railway lines opened in 1858
Rail transport in Lancashire
Skelmersdale